Maxime Authom and Ruben Bemelmans are the defending champions, having won the event in 2012, but lost in the first round.

Jonathan Erlich and Andy Ram won the title, defeating James Cerretani and Adil Shamasdin in the final, 6–1, 6–4.

Seeds

Draw

References 
 Draw

Odlum Brown Vancouver Open
Vancouver Open